Kyte is a hamlet and basic statistical unit (grunnkrets) in the municipality of Voss in Vestland county, Norway.

Kyte includes Nedra Kyte (literally, 'lower Kyte'; elevation ) to the southwest and Øvre Kyte (literally, 'upper Kyte'; elevation ) to the northeast. The settlement is accessible via Norwegian County Road 308, also known as Kytesvegen 'Kyte Road'.

The settlement was attested as Kytuin in 1303 (and as Kytin in 1417 and Kythen in 1468, among other names). The name is originally a compound of *Kýt-(v)in; the first element may mean 'hump, rise' and the second element, vin, is a common Old Norse place-name element meaning 'meadow, pasture'.

References

External links
Kyte at FINN kart
Kyte at Norgeskart

Voss
Villages in Vestland